Marion County is a county located in the U.S. state of Ohio. As of the 2020 census, the population was 65,359. Its county seat is Marion. The county was created in 1820 and later organized in 1824. It is named for General Francis "The Swamp Fox" Marion, a South Carolinian officer in the Revolutionary War.

Marion County comprises the Marion, OH Micropolitan Statistical Area, which is also included in the Columbus-Marion-Zanesville, OH Combined Statistical Area.

Geography
It is the fifth-smallest county in Ohio by total area.

Adjacent counties
 Crawford County (northeast)
 Morrow County (east)
 Delaware County (south)
 Union County (southwest)
 Hardin County (west)
 Wyandot County (northwest)

Major highways

Demographics

2000 census
As of the census of 2000, there were 66,217 people, 24,578 households, and 17,253 families living in the county. The population density was 164 people per square mile (63/km2). There were 26,298 housing units at an average density of 65 per square mile (25/km2). The racial makeup of the county was 92.10% White, 5.75% Black or African American, 0.19% Native American, 0.52% Asian, 0.01% Pacific Islander, 0.49% from other races, and 0.95% from two or more races. 1.09% of the population were Hispanic or Latino of any race.

There were 24,578 households, out of which 32.30% had children under the age of 18 living with them, 54.50% were married couples living together, 11.40% had a female householder with no husband present, and 29.80% were non-families. 25.10% of all households were made up of individuals, and 10.90% had someone living alone who was 65 years of age or older. The average household size was 2.50 and the average family size was 2.98.

In the county, the population was spread out, with 24.50% under the age of 18, 8.30% from 18 to 24, 30.30% from 25 to 44, 23.50% from 45 to 64, and 13.40% who were 65 years of age or older. The median age was 37 years. For every 100 females there were 106.90 males. For every 100 females age 18 and over, there were 107.10 males.

The median income for a household in the county was $38,709, and the median income for a family was $45,297. Males had a median income of $33,179 versus $23,586 for females. The per capita income for the county was $18,255. About 7.40% of families and 9.70% of the population were below the poverty line, including 13.60% of those under age 18 and 5.50% of those age 65 or over.

2010 census
As of the 2010 United States Census, there were 66,501 people, 24,691 households, and 16,837 families living in the county. The racial makeup of the county was 91.1% white, 5.7% black or African American, 0.5% Asian, 0.2% American Indian, 0.1% Pacific islander, 0.8% from other races, and 1.7% from two or more races. Those of Hispanic or Latino origin made up 2.3% of the population. In terms of ancestry, 29.7% were German, 15.2% were Irish, 14.7% were American, and 10.2% were English.

Of the 24,691 households, 31.8% had children under the age of 18 living with them, 49.4% were married couples living together, 13.3% had a female householder with no husband present, 31.8% were non-families, and 26.3% of all households were made up of individuals. The average household size was 2.47 and the average family size was 2.94. The median age was 39.9 years.

The median income for a household in the county was $40,511 and the median income for a family was $50,900. Males had a median income of $39,741 versus $30,161 for females. The per capita income for the county was $19,849. About 13.1% of families and 17.3% of the population were below the poverty line, including 24.6% of those under age 18 and 9.4% of those age 65 or over.

Politics
Prior to 1940, Marion County supported Democrats in presidential elections, only voting for Republican candidates five times from 1856 to 1936. But starting with the 1940 election, the county has become a Republican stronghold in presidential elections with Lyndon B. Johnson being the only Democrat to win since, but Bill Clinton came within just 630 votes of winning it in 1996.

|}

Government

Marion County is represented by two members of the Ohio House of Representatives, as it is split between the 86th and 87th Ohio House Districts. State Representative Tracy Richardson, elected in 2018, represents the 86th Ohio House district, and Riordan T. McClain, appointed in 2018, serves the 87th Ohio House District.

The entirety of Marion County lies within the 26th Ohio Senate District, currently represented by Bill Reineke, who defeated Democrat Craig Swartz in the 2020 Ohio Senate election.

Education

Colleges and universities
 Marion Technical College
 Ohio State University, Marion Campus

Public school districts
Five school districts cover the majority of Marion County:
 Elgin Local Schools
 Marion City School District
 Pleasant Local School District
 Ridgedale Local School District
 River Valley Local School District
Additionally, Buckeye Valley Local School District, Cardington-Lincoln Local Schools, Northmor Local School District, and Upper Sandusky Exempted Village School District cover small areas on the edges of the county.

Communities

City
 Marion (county seat)

Villages
 Caledonia
 Green Camp
 LaRue
 Morral
 New Bloomington
 Prospect
 Waldo

Townships

 Big Island
 Bowling Green
 Claridon
 Grand
 Grand Prairie
 Green Camp
 Marion
 Montgomery
 Pleasant
 Prospect
 Richland
 Salt Rock
 Scott
 Tully
 Waldo

Unincorporated communities

 Bellaire Gardens
 Big Island
 Brush Ridge
 Centerville
 Claridon
 DeCliff
 Espyville
 Gast Corner
 Kirkpatrick
 Lynn
 Martel
 Meeker
 Owens
 Tobias

See also
 National Register of Historic Places listings in Marion County, Ohio
 Marion County, OH partners with Software Solutions Inc. of Dayton, Ohio for Accounting, Payroll, and Budgeting software in 2019

References

External links
 Marion County Government website
 

 
1824 establishments in Ohio
Populated places established in 1824